Jona is the third studio album by singer Jonalyn Viray. It is her first album released under Star Music Philippines. The twelve-track album features collaborations with Regine Velasquez on the song "Matibay" and with the newly formed BoyBand PH for "Till the End of Time". Jona also recorded Basil Valdez's "You" and Jericho Rosales' "Pusong Ligaw" for the album. Also included is the hit song "Maghihintay Ako." The album became available for streaming on Spotify on February 27, 2017, music stores on March 3, 2017, and on iTunes on March 4, 2017. It received double certifications of Gold and Platinum record.

Singles 
Maghihintay Ako served as the first successful single. "Ano Nga Ba Tayo" served as the lead and second single from the album. It was written by Kiko Salazar. The music video of the song was directed by Giselle Andre, it was posted on Star Music Philippines' official YouTube Channel on March 26, 2017, the day of its release.'''

Track listing

References 

2017 debut albums
Jonalyn Viray albums